In set theory, a regular cardinal is a  cardinal number that is equal to its own cofinality.  More explicitly, this means that  is a regular cardinal if and only if every unbounded subset  has cardinality .  Infinite well-ordered cardinals that are not regular are called singular cardinals. Finite cardinal numbers are typically not called regular or singular.

In the presence of the axiom of choice, any cardinal number can be well-ordered, and then the following are equivalent for a cardinal :
  is a regular cardinal.
  is a regular ordinal (see below)
Crudely speaking, this means that a regular cardinal is one that cannot be broken down into a small number of smaller parts.

The situation is slightly more complicated in contexts where the axiom of choice might fail, as in that case not all cardinals are necessarily the cardinalities of well-ordered sets. In that case, the above equivalence holds for well-orderable cardinals only.

A regular ordinal is always an initial ordinal, though some initial ordinals are not regular, e.g.,  (see the example below).

Examples 

(aleph-null) is a regular cardinal because its initial ordinal, is regular. It can also be seen directly to be regular, as the cardinal sum of a finite number of finite cardinal numbers is itself finite.

It is singular, since it is not a limit ordinal.  is the next limit ordinal after .

Assuming the axiom of choice, the union of a countable set of countable sets is itself countable. So  cannot be written as the sum of a countable set of countable cardinal numbers, and is regular.

Uncountable (weak) limit cardinals that are also regular are known as (weakly) inaccessible cardinals.  They cannot be proved to exist within ZFC, though their existence is not known to be inconsistent with ZFC. Their existence is sometimes taken as an additional axiom.  Inaccessible cardinals are necessarily fixed points of the aleph function, though not all fixed points are regular.  For instance, the first fixed point is the limit of the -sequence  and is therefore singular.

Properties 

If the axiom of choice holds, then every successor cardinal is regular. Thus the regularity or singularity of most aleph numbers can be checked depending on whether the cardinal is a successor cardinal or a limit cardinal. Some cardinalities cannot be proven to be equal to any particular aleph, for instance the cardinality of the continuum, whose value in ZFC may be any uncountable cardinal of uncountable cofinality (see Easton's theorem).

Without the axiom of choice, there would be cardinal numbers that were not well-orderable. Moreover, the cardinal sum of an arbitrary collection could not be defined. Therefore, only the aleph numbers can meaningfully be called regular or singular cardinals. Furthermore, a successor aleph need not be regular. For instance, the union of a countable set of countable sets need not be countable. It is consistent with ZF that  be the limit of a countable sequence of countable ordinals as well as the set of real numbers be a countable union of countable sets.

See also 
 Inaccessible cardinal

References

 , Elements of Set Theory, 
 , Set Theory, An Introduction to Independence Proofs, 

Cardinal numbers
Ordinal numbers